Nizhny Kuyum (Altıgı Kuyum) is a rural locality (a selo) in Uznezinskoye Rural Settlement of Chemalsky District, the Altai Republic, Russia. The population was 21 as of 2016. There is 1 street.

Geography 
Nizhny Kuyum is located in the valley of the Kuyum River, 26 km northeast of Chemal (the district's administrative centre) by road. Elekmonar is the nearest rural locality.

References 

Rural localities in Chemalsky District